Jürgen Berghahn (born 5 July 1960 in Blomberg) is a German politician of the Social Democratic Party (SPD) who has been serving as a member of the German Bundestag for Lippe I since the 2021 German federal election. Previously, he was a member of the North Rhine-Westphalia state parliament from 2010 to 2021.

Early life and career
Berghahn did an apprenticeship as an electrician. He worked for Schieder Möbel for 26 years until the company's insolvency. He was a member of the company’s works council from 1994 to 2008 and served as deputy chairman of the group workers council from 2002 until 2008. Berghahn is a lecturer in adult education for private and trade union educational institutions. He has been a member of IG Metall since 1984.

Political career
Berghahn has been a member of the Blomberg town council and local chairman of Istrup since 2004. He has been the chairman of the Blomberg real estate and property management since 2004. He is chairman of the SPD local association Istrup/Wellentrup. 

Berghahn was elected as a member of the State Parliament of North Rhine-Westphalia in the state parliamentary constituency of Lippe II in the state elections of 2010, 2012, and 2017.

Member of the German Parliament, 2021–present
Berghahn ran as an SPD direct candidate for the federal constituency Lippe I and won the direct mandate in the 2021 federal election. In the course of this, he resigned his state parliament mandate. Nina Andrieshen succeeded him in the state parliament.

In parliament, Berghahn has been serving on the Committee on Transport. Within his parliamentary group, he belongs to the Parliamentary Left, a left-wing movement.

Personal life
Berghahn is married and the father of two children.

See also 

 List of members of the 20th Bundestag

References

External links

 Website of Jürgen Berghahn
 Biography at the German Bundestag

 

1960 births
Living people
Members of the Bundestag for the Social Democratic Party of Germany
Members of the Bundestag 2021–2025
Members of the Bundestag for North Rhine-Westphalia
21st-century German politicians
Social Democratic Party of Germany politicians
People from Lippe
Members of the Landtag of North Rhine-Westphalia